Lucciola is a 1917 Italian film directed by Augusto Genina.

Cast
Oreste Bilancia
Francesco Cacace
Emilia Giorgi
Helena Makowska
Fernanda Negri Pouget
Enrico Roma
Franz Sala
Mario Salo
Umberto Scalpellini
Nella Tessieri-Frediani
Paolo Wullmann

External links 
 

1917 films
Italian silent feature films
Films directed by Augusto Genina
Italian black-and-white films